Baierl is a surname. Notable people with the surname include:

Helmut Baierl (1926–2005), German playwright
Lotte Baierl (1928–2015), Austrian underwater diver, model, and actress